Au plus près du Soleil is a 2015 French drama film directed by Yves Angelo and co-written by Angelo, François Dupeyron and Gilles Legrand.

Plot 
Investigating magistrate Sophie learns that Juliette, a woman who she is questioning in regards to an ongoing case, is the biological mother of Léo, her adopted son. Despite her magistrate husband Olivier's disapproval, Sophie refuses to withdraw from the case so that she can continue her probe on Juliette, whilst hiding the truth from Léo. Appalled by Sophie's decision, Olivier decides to secretly approach Juliette without revealing his true identity.

Cast 
 Sylvie Testud as Sophie Picard 
 Grégory Gadebois as Olivier Poncet 
 Mathilde Bisson as Juliette Larrain 
 Zacharie Chasseriaud as Léo Poncet
 John Arnold as Pierre  
 Pascal Ternisien as The accused man
 Thomas Doret as The accused man's son

References

External links 
 

2015 films
2010s psychological drama films
2010s French-language films
French psychological drama films
Films directed by Yves Angelo
2015 drama films
2010s French films